Shirasuna Dam is a dam in the Gunma Prefecture of Japan, completed in 1940.

References 

Dams in Gunma Prefecture
Dams completed in 1940